"Along the Navajo Trail" is a country/pop song, written by Dick Charles (pseudonym for Richard Charles Krieg), Larry Markes and Eddie DeLange in 1945, and first recorded by Dinah Shore in May 1945.

Background
It was the title song of the 1945 Roy Rogers film Along the Navajo Trail. It was also used in the 1945 film Don't Fence Me In, when it was sung by Roy Rogers and the Sons of the Pioneers.
Members of the Western Writers of America chose it as one of the Top 100 Western songs of all time.

Charts
Charted versions in 1945 were by Bing Crosby and The Andrews Sisters (recorded June 29, 1945) (No. 2); Gene Krupa (vocal by Buddy Stewart) (No. 7); and Dinah Shore (No. 7).

Other recordings
The song has been recorded by many other artists, including:

 Steve Conway (1946)

Sam Cooke - included on his album Encore (1958).
Duane Eddy - included on his album Especially for You (1959).
Fats Domino (1963)
The Honey Dreamers
Hot Club of Cowtown (2011) - for album "What Makes Bob Holler".
Steve Kuhn and Toshiko Akiyoshi
Frankie Laine - for his album Hell Bent for Leather! (1961).
Riders in the Sky
Roy Rogers (1945).
Peg Leg Sam, although the song is named Navaho Trail and is slightly different.
Dinah Shore (1945)
Bob Wills and the Texas Playboys
Michael Nesmith - included on his album From a Radio Engine to the Photon Wing (1977).

References 

1945 songs
Western music (North America)
Songs written by Dick Charles
Songs written by Larry Markes
Songs with lyrics by Eddie DeLange